Human hair color is the pigmentation of human hair follicles due to two types of melanin: eumelanin and pheomelanin. Generally, if more melanin is present, the color of the hair is darker; if less melanin is present, the hair is lighter. The tone of the hair is dependent on the ratio of black or brown eumelanin to yellow or red pheomelanin. Levels of melanin can vary over time causing a person's hair color to change, and it is possible to have hair follicles of more than one color on the same person. Some hair colors are associated with some ethnic groups due to observed higher frequency of particular hair color within their geographical region, e.g. straight dark hair amongst East Asians, a large variety of dark, fair, curly, wavy and bushy hair amongst Europeans, curly, dark, and uniquely helical hair with Africans, whilst gray, white or "silver" hair is often associated with age and wisdom.

Genetics and biochemistry of hair color

The full genetic basis of hair color is complex and not fully understood. Regulatory DNA is believed to be closely involved in pigmentation in humans in general, and a 2011 study by Branicki et al. identified 13 DNA variations across 11 different genes that could be used to predict hair color.

Two types of pigment give hair its color, black-brown eumelanin and reddish-brown/reddish-yellow pheomelanin, synthesized by melanocytes. Inside the melanocytes, tyrosine is converted into L-DOPA and then L-dopaquinone, which in turn is formed into pheomelanin or eumelanin.

Different hair color phenotypes arise primarily as a result of varying ratios of these two pigments in the human population, although Europeans show the greatest range in pigmentation overall. In addition, other genetic and environmental factors can affect hair color in humans; for instance, mutations in the melanocortin 1 receptor (MC1R) gene can lead to red or auburn hair, and exposure to ultraviolet radiation can damage hair and alter its pigmentation. Ultraviolet radiation (UV radiation) triggers greater synthesis of several compounds, including pro-opiomelanocortin (POMC), α-MSH, and ACTH, the result being increased eumelanin production. UV radiation most commonly comes from the sun, and thus populations from places closer to the equator tend to have darker hair, because eumelanin is generally more photoprotective than pheomelanin.

Pheomelanin colors hair orange and red. Eumelanin, which has two subtypes of black or brown, determines the darkness of the hair color; more black eumelanin leads to blacker hair, and more brown eumelanin to browner hair. All human hair has some amount of both pigments. Over 95% of melanin content in black and brown hair is eumelanin. Pheomelanin is generally found in elevated concentrations in blond and red hair, representing about one-third of total melanin content. If there is no black eumelanin, the result is strawberry blond. Blond hair results from small amounts of brown eumelanin with no black eumelanin.

Natural hair colors
Natural hair color can be black, brown, auburn (mix of brown and red), red, blond, or white.

Color shade scale

The scale uses the following designations: A (very light blond), B to E (light blond), F to L (blond), M to O (dark blond), P to T (light brown to brown), U to Y (dark brown to black) and Roman numerals I to IV (red) and V to VI (red blond).

Image gallery

Black hair

Black hair is the darkest hair color. It has large amounts of eumelanin and is more dense than other hair colors.

Brown hair

Brown hair is the second most common human hair color, after black. Brown hair is characterized by higher levels of eumelanin and lower levels of pheomelanin. Of the two types of eumelanin (black and brown), brown-haired people have brown eumelanin; they also usually have medium-thick strands of hair. Brown-haired girls or women of European descent are often known as brunettes.

Chestnut hair is a hair color which is a reddish shade of brown hair. In contrast to auburn hair, the reddish shade of chestnut is darker. Chestnut hair is common among the native peoples of Northern, Central, Western, and Eastern Europe.

Auburn hair

Auburn hair ranges along a spectrum of light to dark red-brown shades. The chemicals which cause auburn hair are eumelanin (brown) and pheomelanin (red), with a higher proportion of red-causing pheomelanin than is found in average brown hair. It is most commonly found in individuals of Northern and Western European descent. It can also be the result of a mutation in the melanocortin 1 receptor gene.

Red hair

Red hair ranges from light strawberry blond shades to titian, copper, and completely red. Red hair has the highest amounts of pheomelanin, around 67%, and usually low levels of eumelanin. At 1–2% of the west Eurasian population, it is the least common hair color in the world. It is most prominently found in the British Isles and in Udmurtia. Scotland has the highest proportion of redheads; 13 percent of the population has red hair and approximately 40 percent carry the recessive redhead gene.

Blond hair

Blond (sometimes blonde for women) hair ranges from pale white (platinum blond) to dark gold blond. Strawberry blond, a mixture of blond and red hair, is a much rarer type containing the most pheomelanin.
Blond hair can have almost any proportion of pheomelanin and eumelanin, but has only small amounts of both. More pheomelanin creates a more golden or strawberry blond color, and more eumelanin creates an ash or sandy blond color. Blond hair is most commonly found in Northern and Northeastern Europeans and their descendants but can be found spread around most of Europe. Studies in 2012 showed that naturally blond hair of Melanesians is caused by a recessive mutation in tyrosinase-related protein 1 (TYRP1). In the Solomon Islands, 26% of the population carry the gene; however, it is absent outside of Oceania.

Gray and white hair

Gray or white hair is not caused by a true gray or white pigment, but is due to a lack of pigmentation and melanin. The clear hairs appear as gray or white because of the way light is reflected from the hairs. Gray hair color typically occurs naturally as people age (see aging or achromotrichia below).

In some cases, gray hair may be caused by thyroid deficiencies, Waardenburg syndrome or a vitamin B12 deficiency. At some point in the human life cycle, cells that are located in the base of the hair's follicles slow, and eventually stop producing pigment. Piebaldism is a rare autosomal dominant disorder of melanocyte development, which may cause a congenital white forelock.

Europeans often begin to grow gray hairs in their mid-30s while Asians begin graying in their late 30s, but most Africans retain their original hair color until their mid-40s.
Permanently white hair starting in childhood can be genetically inherited, but unlike albinism, there are no negative medical implications. The trait follows X-linked recessive inheritance, and so is more common in men, and women can be carriers without being affected.

Graying is a gradual process; according to a study by L'Oreal, overall, of those between 45 and 65 years old, 74% had some gray hair, covering an average of 27% of their head, and approximately 1 in 10 people had no gray hairs even after the age of 60.

Marie Antoinette syndrome is a proposed phenomenon in which sudden whitening is caused by stress. It has been found that some hairs can become colored again when stress is reduced.

Conditions affecting hair color

Aging or achromotrichia
Children born with some hair colors may find it gradually darkens as they grow. Many blond, light brown, or red haired infants experience this. This is caused by genes being turned on and off during early childhood and puberty.

Changes in hair color typically occur naturally as people age, eventually turning the hair gray and then white. This is called achromotrichia. Achromotrichia normally begins in the early to mid-twenties in men and late twenties in women. More than 60 percent of Americans have some gray hair by age 40. The age at which graying begins seems almost entirely due to genetics. Sometimes people are born with gray hair because they inherit the trait.

The order in which graying happens is usually: nose hair, hair on the head, beard, body hair, eyebrows.

In non-balding individuals, hair may grow faster once it turns gray. Unlike in the skin where pigment production is continuous, melanogenesis in the hair is closely associated with stages of the hair cycle. Hair is actively pigmented in the anagen phase and is "turned off" during the catagen phase, and absent during telogen. Thus, a single hair cannot be white on the root side, and colored on the terminal side.

Several genes appear to be responsible for the process of graying. Bcl2 and Bcl-w were the first two discovered, then in 2016, the IRF4 (interferon regulatory factor 4) gene was announced after a study of 6,000 people living in five Latin American countries. However, it found that environmental factors controlled about 70% of cases of hair graying.

The change in hair color occurs when melanin ceases to be produced in the hair root and new hairs grow in without pigment. The stem cells at the base of hair follicles produce melanocytes, the cells that produce and store pigment in hair and skin. The death of the melanocyte stem cells causes the onset of graying. It remains unclear why the stem cells of one hair follicle may fail to activate well over a decade before those in adjacent follicles less than a millimeter apart. 

Graying of hair may be triggered by the accumulation of hydrogen peroxide and abnormally low levels of the enzyme catalase, which breaks down hydrogen peroxide and relieves oxidative stress in patients with vitiligo. Since vitiligo can cause eyelashes to turn white, the same process is believed to be involved in hair on the head (and elsewhere) due to aging.

The anti-cancer drug imatinib has recently been shown to reverse the graying process. However, it is expensive and has potentially severe and deadly side effects, so it is not practical to use to alter a person's hair color. Nevertheless, if the mechanism of action of imatinib on melanocyte stem cells can be discovered, it is possible that a safer and less expensive substitute drug might someday be developed. It is not yet known whether imatinib has an effect on catalase, or if its reversal of the graying process is due to something else.

Stress
Anecdotes report that stress, both chronic and acute, may induce achromotrichia earlier in individuals than it otherwise would have. Proponents point to survivors of disasters, such as Titanic survivor Harold Bride, prisoner of war John McCain, or high-level politicians such as Bill Clinton or Barack Obama. There is some evidence for chronic stress causing premature achromotrichia, but no definite link has been established. It is known that the stress hormone cortisol accumulates in human hair over time, but whether this has any effect on hair color has not yet been resolved. A 2020 paper, published in the journal Nature reported that stress can cause hair to lose its pigment. An overactive immune response can destroy melanocytes and melanocyte stem cells in black-haired rats. When intentionally subjecting them to panic, they bleached their coat. The next time the rats' coat grew, there were no melanocyte stem cells in these damaged follicles, so white hairs sprouted, and the color loss was permanent.

UV damage
Excessive exposure to the sun is the most common cause of structural damage of the hair shaft. Photochemical hair damage encompasses hair protein degradation and loss, as well as hair pigment deterioration Photobleaching is common among people with European ancestry. Around 72 percent of customers who agreed to be involved in a study and have European ancestry reported in a recent 23andMe research that the sun lightens their hair. The company also have identified 48 genetic markers that may influence hair photobleaching.

Medical conditions
Albinism is a genetic abnormality in which little or no pigment is found in human hair, eyes, and skin. The hair is often white or pale blond. However, it can be red, darker blond, light brown, or rarely, even dark brown.

Vitiligo is a patchy loss of hair and skin color that may occur as the result of an auto-immune disease. In a preliminary 2013 study, researchers treated the buildup of hydrogen peroxide which causes this with a light-activated pseudo-catalase. This produced significant media coverage that further investigation may someday lead to a general non-dye treatment for gray hair.

Malnutrition is also known to cause hair to become lighter, thinner, and more brittle. Dark hair may turn reddish or blondish due to the decreased production of melanin. The condition is reversible with proper nutrition.

Werner syndrome and pernicious anemia can also cause premature graying.

A 2005 uncontrolled study demonstrated that people 50–70 years of age with dark eyebrows but gray hair are significantly more likely to have type II diabetes than those with both gray eyebrows and hair.

Artificial factors
A 1996 British Medical Journal study found that tobacco smoking may cause premature graying. Smokers were found to be four times more likely to begin graying prematurely, compared to nonsmokers.

Gray hair may temporarily darken after inflammatory processes, after electron-beam-induced alopecia, and after some chemotherapy regimens. Much remains to be learned about the physiology of human graying.

There are no special diets, nutritional supplements, vitamins, or proteins that have been proven to slow, stop, or in any way affect the graying process, although many have been marketed over the years. However, French scientists treating leukemia patients with imatinib, a drug used in treating cancer, noted an unexpected side effect: some of the patients' hair color was restored to their pre-gray color.

Changes after death
The hair color of buried bodies can change. Hair contains a mixture of black-brown-yellow eumelanin and red pheomelanin. Eumelanin is less chemically stable than pheomelanin and breaks down faster when oxidized. The color of hair changes faster under extreme conditions. It changes more slowly under dry oxidizing conditions (such as in burials in sand or in ice) than under wet reducing conditions (such as burials in wood or plaster coffins).

Hair coloring

Hair color can be changed by a chemical process. Hair coloring is classed as "permanent" or "semi-permanent".

Permanent hair color means that the hair's structure has been chemically altered until it is eventually cut away. This does not mean that the synthetic color will remain permanently. During the process, the natural color is removed, one or more shades, and synthetic color has been put in its place. All pigments wash out of the cuticle. Natural color stays in much longer and artificial will fade the fastest (depending on the color molecules and the form of the dye pigments).

Permanent hair color gives the most flexibility because it can make hair lighter or darker as well as changing tone and color, but there are negatives. Constant (monthly or six-weekly) maintenance is essential to match new hair growing in to the rest of the hair, and to remedy fading. A one-color permanent dye creates a flat, uniform color across the whole head, which can look unnatural and harsh, especially in a fair shade. To combat this, the modern trend is to use multiple colors—usually one color as a base with added highlights or lowlights in other shades.

Semi-permanent color washes out over a period of time—typically four to six weeks, so root regrowth is less noticeable. The final color of each strand is affected by its original color and porosity, so there will be subtle variations in color across the head—more natural and less harsh than a permanent dye. However, this means that gray and white hair will not dye to the same color as the rest of the head (in fact, some white hair will not absorb the color at all). A few gray and white hairs will blend in sufficiently not to be noticeable, but as they become more widespread, there will come a point where a semi-permanent alone will not be enough. The move to 100% permanent color can be delayed by using a semi-permanent as a base color, with permanent highlights.

Semi-permanent hair color cannot lighten hair. Hair can only be lightened using chemical lighteners, such as bleach. Bleaching is always permanent because it removes the natural pigment.

"Rinses" are a form of temporary hair color, usually applied to hair during a shampoo and washed out again the next time the hair is washed.

See also
Human skin color

References

External links

 
Biological anthropology